Adolf Edward Nussbaum (10 January 1925 –  31 October 2009) was a German-born American theoretical mathematician who was a professor of mathematics at Washington University in St. Louis for nearly 40 years. He worked with others in 20th-century theoretical physics and mathematics such as J. Robert Oppenheimer and John von Neumann, and was acquainted with Albert Einstein.

Early years
Nussbaum was born to a Jewish family in Rheydt, a borough of the German city Mönchengladbach in northwestern Germany, in 1925. The youngest of three children, he was a Holocaust survivor and was orphaned after the Nazi takeover of Germany.

Both his father, Karl Nussbaum, a wounded veteran of World War I during which he had been awarded the Iron Cross, and his mother, Franziska, was murdered at Auschwitz. His brother, Erwin Nussbaum, was also captured and killed. Nussbaum and his sister, Lieselotte, were separated and sent on a Kindertransport to Belgium in 1939.

When Belgium was invaded by Germany, Nussbaum escaped to southern France, then under the Vichy regime. He lived there at an orphanage known as Château de la Hille. He began his teaching career there, while still a teenager, teaching mathematics to the younger children.

After being captured twice, and jailed once by the Nazis, he escaped on foot to Switzerland, where he attended the University of Zurich, studying both mathematics and physics. In 1947, he was sponsored by relatives in New Jersey to emigrate to the United States.

Career

Shortly after emigrating to the United States, he studied mathematics at Brooklyn College before transferring to Columbia University in New York where he earned his master of arts degree in 1950 and his Ph.D. in 1957.

While writing his thesis for Columbia, he worked in the academic year 1952–1953 at the Institute for Advanced Study in Princeton with John von Neumann, a mathematician who used Hilbert spaces in his development of the mathematical basis of quantum mechanics. Hilbert spaces eventually became Nussbaum's area of expertise and he wrote several papers with von Neumann on this topic. During this period, Nussbaum also became acquainted with Albert Einstein, another of the original group at the Institute for Advanced Study.

Nussbaum's thesis was accepted with no revisions and he received his doctorate shortly thereafter.

In the meantime he had worked at the University of Connecticut in Storrs, where he co-authored papers with Allen Devinatz, and at the Rensselaer Polytechnic Institute in Troy, New York. He followed Devinatz to St. Louis to teach at Washington University in 1958.
 
In 1962, he was a visiting scholar at the Institute for Advanced Studies working with Robert Oppenheimer; in 1967–68 he was a visiting scholar at Stanford University in Palo Alto, California.

He joined Washington University's mathematics faculty as an assistant professor in 1958. He became a full professor in 1966 and taught until 1995, when he was named an emeritus professor.

Personal life
Nussbaum married his cousin's sister-in-law, Anne Ebbin, on September 1, 1957. They had a son, Karl Erich Nussbaum and a daughter, Franziska Suzanne Nussbaum. He died in St. Louis, Missouri, in 2009.

Selected publications
 
 
 
 
 
 
 
 
 
 
 
 
 
 
 
 }

Notes

1925 births
2009 deaths
20th-century American mathematicians
21st-century American mathematicians
Mathematical analysts
Jewish American scientists
Washington University physicists
Columbia University alumni
Institute for Advanced Study visiting scholars
Washington University in St. Louis faculty
German emigrants to the United States
Kindertransport refugees
Washington University in St. Louis mathematicians
People from Mönchengladbach
Scientists from St. Louis
Rensselaer Polytechnic Institute faculty
Brooklyn College alumni